John Park may refer to:

 John Park (educator) (1775–1852) in Boston, Massachusetts
 John Park (inventor) (1814–1872), inventor of limecrete, a nineteenth century building material
 John Duane Park (1819–1896), Chief Justice of the Connecticut Supreme Court
 John R. Park (1833–1900), doctor, teacher, president of University of Utah
 John Park (VC) (1835–1863), Irish sergeant who received the Victoria Cross
 John Park (architect) (1879–1948), New Zealand architect and mayor
 John Park (sailor) (1924-2004), Olympic sailor from Hong Kong
 Jon Jon Park (born 1957), British swimmer, born John Park
 John Park (politician) (born 1973), Scottish Labour Party politician 
 John Park (musician) (born 1988), American singer
 John Edgar Park, computer animator
 Johnny Park, musician in the duo Archer/Park

See also
 John Park Finley (1854–1943), American meteorologist
 John S. Park Historic Park, Las Vegas, Nevada
 John Parke (disambiguation)